Hore is an English surname, a variant of Hoare, and is derived from the Middle English hor(e) meaning grey- or white-haired. Notable people with the surname include:

 Andrew Hore (born 1978), New Zealand rugby player, brother of Charlie
 Bradley Hore (born 1981), Australian flyweight boxer
 Charlie Hore (born 1976), New Zealand rugby player, brother of Andrew
 several people named John Hore
 María Gertrudis Hore (1742–1801), Spanish poet
 Peter Hore (born 1960), Australian activist
 Peter Hore (chemist), professor of chemistry at Oxford
 Richard Hore (floruit 1536), English sea captain and explorer of Canada
 Somnath Hore (1921–2006), Indian sculptor and printmaker
 Thomas Hore (died 1406), English MP

See also 
 Patrick Hore-Ruthven (1913–1942), British soldier and poet
 Hore Abbey, a ruined monastery in Ireland
 Høre Stave Church, a Norwegian church
 Hor (disambiguation)

References